Tatyanoba (also, Tat’yanoba and Tat’yanovka) is a village and municipality in the Masally Rayon of Azerbaijan.  It has a population of 1,463.

References 

Populated places in Masally District